Simone Lucie Ernestine Marie Bertrand de Beauvoir (9 January 1908 – 14 April 1986) was a French existentialist philosopher, writer, social theorist, and feminist activist. Though she did not consider herself a philosopher, nor was she considered one at the time of her death, she had a significant influence on both feminist existentialism and feminist theory.

Beauvoir wrote novels, essays, biographies, autobiographies, and monographs on philosophy, politics, and social issues. She was known for her dissertation, The Second Sex (1949), a detailed analysis of women's oppression and a foundational tract of contemporary feminism. She was also known for her novels, the most known including She Came to Stay (1943) and The Mandarins (1954). Her most enduring contribution to literature is her memoirs, notably the first volume, "Mémoires d'une jeune fille rangée" (1958), which has a warmth and descriptive power. She also was a highly awarded woman, some of the most notable prizes being: 1954 Prix Goncourt, the 1975 Jerusalem Prize, and the 1978 Austrian State Prize for European Literature.

Early years
Beauvoir was born on 9 January 1908 into a bourgeois Parisian family in the 6th arrondissement. Her parents were Georges Bertrand de Beauvoir, a lawyer, who once aspired to be an actor, and Françoise Beauvoir (née Brasseur), a wealthy banker's daughter and devout Catholic. Simone had a sister, Hélène, who was born two years later on June 6, 1910. The family struggled to maintain their bourgeois status after losing much of their fortune shortly after World War I, and Françoise insisted the two daughters be sent to a prestigious convent school.

Beauvoir was intellectually precocious, fueled by her father's encouragement; he reportedly would boast, "Simone thinks like a man!" Because of her family's straitened circumstances, she could no longer rely on her dowry, and like other middle-class girls of her age, her marriage opportunities were put at risk. She took this opportunity to take steps towards earning a living for herself.

She first worked with Maurice Merleau-Ponty and Claude Lévi-Strauss, when all three completed their practice teaching requirements at the same secondary school. Although not officially enrolled, she sat in on courses at the École Normale Supérieure in preparation for the agrégation in philosophy, a highly competitive postgraduate examination that serves as a national ranking of students. It was while studying for it that she met École Normale students Jean-Paul Sartre, Paul Nizan, and René Maheu (who gave her the lasting nickname "Castor", or "beaver"). The jury for the agrégation narrowly awarded Sartre first place instead of Beauvoir, who placed second and, at age 21, was the youngest person ever to pass the exam. Additionally, Beauvoir finished an exam for the certificate of "General Philosophy and Logic" second to Simone Weil.

Writing of her youth in Memoirs of a Dutiful Daughter she said:
"...my father's individualism and pagan ethical standards were in complete contrast to the rigidly moral conventionalism of my mother's teaching. This disequilibrium, which made my life a kind of endless disputation, is the main reason why I became an intellectual."

Secondary and post-secondary education
Beauvoir pursued post-secondary education after completing her high school years at Lycée Fenelon. She then studied philosophy at the Sorbonne and after completing her degree in 1928, wrote her  (roughly equivalent to an M.A. thesis) on Leibniz for Léon Brunschvicg (the topic was "Le concept chez Leibniz" ["The Concept in Leibniz"]). Her studies of political philosophy through university influenced her to start thinking of societal concerns rather than her issues.

Religious upbringing
Beauvoir was raised in a strict Catholic household. In her youth, she was sent to convent schools. She was deeply religious as a child, at one point intending to become a nun. At age 14, Beauvoir questioned her faith as she saw many changes in the world after witnessing tragedies throughout her life. Consequently, she abandoned her faith in her early teens and remained an atheist for the rest of her life. To explain her atheist beliefs, Beauvoir stated, "Faith allows an evasion of those difficulties which the atheist confronts honestly. And to crown all, the believer derives a sense of great superiority from this very cowardice itself."

Middle years

From 1929 through 1943, Beauvoir taught at the lycée level until she could support herself solely on the earnings of her writings.

Beauvoir and Jean-Paul Sartre met during her college years. Intrigued by her determination as an educator, he intended to make their relationship romantic. However, she had no interest in doing so. During October 1929, Jean-Paul Sartre and Beauvoir became a couple. After they were confronted by her father, Sartre asked her to marry him on a provisional basis: One day while they were sitting on a bench outside the Louvre, he said, "Let's sign a two-year lease". Though Beauvoir wrote, "Marriage was impossible. I had no dowry", scholars point out that her ideal relationships described in The Second Sex and elsewhere bore little resemblances to the marriage standards of the day. Instead, she and Sartre entered into a lifelong "soul partnership", which was sexual but not exclusive, nor did it involve living together.

Sartre and Beauvoir always read each other's work. Debate continues about the extent to which they influenced each other in their existentialist works, such as Sartre's Being and Nothingness and Beauvoir's She Came to Stay and "Phenomenology and Intent". However, recent studies of Beauvoir's work focus on influences other than Sartre, including Hegel and Leibniz. The Neo-Hegelian revival led by Alexandre Kojève and Jean Hyppolite in the 1930s inspired a whole generation of French thinkers, including Sartre, to discover Hegel's Phenomenology of Spirit.  However, Beauvoir, reading Hegel in German during the war, produced an original critique of his dialectic of consciousness.

Personal life

Beauvoir's prominent open relationships at times overshadowed her substantial academic reputation. A scholar lecturing with her chastised their "distinguished [Harvard] audience [because] every question asked about Sartre concerned his work, while all those asked about Beauvoir concerned her personal life." Beginning in 1929, Beauvoir and Sartre were partners and remained so for 51 years, until his death in 1980. She chose never to marry and never had children. This gave her the time to advance her education and engage in political causes, write and teach, and take lovers. She lived with Claude Lanzmann from 1952 to 1959.

Perhaps her most famous lover was American author Nelson Algren. She met him in Chicago in 1947, she wrote to him across the Atlantic as "my beloved husband." Algren won the National Book Award for The Man with the Golden Arm in 1950, and in 1954, Beauvoir won France's most prestigious literary prize for The Mandarins, in which Algren is the character Lewis Brogan. Algren vociferously objected to their intimacy becoming public. Years after they separated, she was buried wearing his gift of a silver ring.

When Beauvoir visited Algren in Chicago, Art Shay took well-known nude and portrait photos of Beauvoir. Shay also wrote a play based on Algren, Beauvoir, and Sartre's triangular relationship. The play was stage read in 1999 in Chicago.

Allegations of sexual abuse
Beauvoir was bisexual, and her relationships with young women were controversial. French author Bianca Lamblin (originally Bianca Bienenfeld) wrote in her book Mémoires d'une Jeune Fille Dérangée (published in English under the title A Disgraceful Affair) that, while a student at Lycée Molière, she was sexually exploited by her teacher Beauvoir, who was in her 30s. Lamblin had affairs with both Sartre and Beauvoir. In 1943, Beauvoir was suspended from her teaching position when she was accused of seducing her 17-year-old lycée pupil Natalie Sorokine in 1939. Sorokine's parents laid formal charges against Beauvoir for debauching a minor (the age of consent in France at the time was 15), and Beauvoir's license to teach in France was revoked, although it was subsequently reinstated.

In 1977, Beauvoir signed a petition seeking to completely remove the age of consent in France. She, along other French intellectuals supported the freeing of three arrested pedophiles. The petition also explicitly addresses the 'Affaire de Versailles', where three adult men, Dejager (age 45), Gallien (age 43), and Burckhardt (age 39) raped minors from both genders aged 12–13.

Moreover, de Beauvoir made several problematic claims surrounding pedophilia and sexual harassment. She was very open about why pedophilia should be decriminalized, this also being a reason of her teaching license being removed. Even when Beauvoir put herself as the ideal feminist, she had several ideals that are against Feminism, thus making her a very controversial woman.

Notable works

She Came to Stay

Beauvoir published her first novel She Came to Stay in 1943. It has been assumed that it is inspired by her and Sartre's sexual relationship with Olga Kosakiewicz and Wanda Kosakiewicz. Olga was one of her students in the Rouen secondary school where Beauvoir taught during the early 1930s. She grew fond of Olga. Sartre tried to pursue Olga but she rejected him, so he began a relationship with her sister Wanda. Upon his death, Sartre was still supporting Wanda. He also supported Olga for years, until she met and married Jacques-Laurent Bost, a lover of Beauvoir. However, the main thrust of the novel is philosophical, a scene in which to situate Beauvoir's abiding philosophical pre-occupation – the relationship between the self and the other.

In the novel, set just before the outbreak of World War II, Beauvoir creates one character from the complex relationships of Olga and Wanda. The fictionalised versions of Beauvoir and Sartre have a ménage à trois with the young woman. The novel also delves into Beauvoir and Sartre's complex relationship and how it was affected by the ménage à trois.

She Came to Stay was followed by many others, including The Blood of Others, which explores the nature of individual responsibility, telling a love story between two young French students participating in the Resistance in World War II.

Existentialist ethics

In 1944, Beauvoir wrote her first philosophical essay, Pyrrhus et Cinéas, a discussion on existentialist ethics. She continued her exploration of existentialism through her second essay The Ethics of Ambiguity (1947); it is perhaps the most accessible entry into French existentialism. In the essay, Beauvoir clears up some inconsistencies that many, Sartre included, have found in major existentialist works such as Being and Nothingness. In The Ethics of Ambiguity, Beauvoir confronts the existentialist dilemma of absolute freedom vs. the constraints of circumstance.

Les Temps Modernes
At the end of World War II, Beauvoir and Sartre edited Les Temps Modernes, a political journal which Sartre founded along with Maurice Merleau-Ponty and others. Beauvoir used Les Temps Modernes to promote her own work and explore her ideas on a small scale before fashioning essays and books. Beauvoir remained an editor until her death.

Sexuality, existentialist feminism and The Second Sex

The Second Sex, first published in 1949 in French as Le Deuxième Sexe, turns the existentialist mantra that existence precedes essence into a feminist one: "One is not born but becomes a woman" (French: "On ne naît pas femme, on le devient"). With this famous phrase, Beauvoir first articulated what has come to be known as the sex-gender distinction, that is, the distinction between biological sex and the social and historical construction of gender and its attendant stereotypes. Beauvoir argues that "the fundamental source of women's oppression is its [femininity's] historical and social construction as the quintessential" Other.

Beauvoir defines women as the "second sex" because women are defined as inferior to men. She pointed out that Aristotle argued women are "female by virtue of a certain lack of qualities", while Thomas Aquinas referred to women as "imperfect men" and the "incidental" being. She quotes "In itself, homosexuality is as limiting as heterosexuality: the ideal should be to be capable of loving a woman or a man; either, a human being, without feeling fear, restraint, or obligation."

Beauvoir asserted that women are as capable of choice as men, and thus can choose to elevate themselves, moving beyond the "immanence" to which they were previously resigned and reaching "transcendence", a position in which one takes responsibility for oneself and the world, where one chooses one's freedom.

Chapters of The Second Sex were originally published in Les Temps modernes, in June 1949. The second volume came a few months after the first in France. It was published soon after in America due to the quick translation by Howard Parshley, as prompted by Blanche Knopf, wife of publisher Alfred A. Knopf. Because Parshley had only a basic familiarity with the French language, and a minimal understanding of philosophy (he was a professor of biology at Smith College), much of Beauvoir's book was mistranslated or inappropriately cut, distorting her intended message. For years, Knopf prevented the introduction of a more accurate retranslation of Beauvoir's work, declining all proposals despite the efforts of existentialist scholars.

Only in 2009 was there a second translation, to mark the 60th anniversary of the original publication. Constance Borde and Sheila Malovany-Chevallier produced the first integral translation in 2010, reinstating a third of the original work.

In the chapter "Woman: Myth and Reality" of The Second Sex, Beauvoir argued that men had made women the "Other" in society by the application of a false aura of "mystery" around them. She argued that men used this as an excuse not to understand women or their problems and not to help them, and that this stereotyping was always done in societies by the group higher in the hierarchy to the group lower in the hierarchy. She wrote that a similar kind of oppression by hierarchy also happened in other categories of identity, such as race, class, and religion, but she claimed that it was nowhere more true than with gender in which men stereotyped women and used it as an excuse to organize society into a patriarchy.

Despite her contributions to the feminist movement, especially the French women's liberation movement, and her beliefs in women's economic independence and equal education, Beauvoir was initially reluctant to call herself a feminist. However, after observing the resurgence of the feminist movement in the late 1960s and early 1970s, Beauvoir stated she no longer believed a socialist revolution to be enough to bring about women's liberation. She publicly declared herself a feminist in 1972 in an interview with Le Nouvel Observateur.

In 2018 the manuscript pages of Le Deuxième Sexe were published. At the time her adopted daughter, Sylvie Le Bon-Beauvoir, a philosophy professor, described her mother's writing process: Beauvoir wrote every page of her books longhand first and only after that would hire typists.

The Mandarins

Published in 1954, The Mandarins won France's highest literary prize, the Prix Goncourt. It is a roman à clef set after the end of World War II and follows the personal lives of philosophers and friends among Sartre's and Beauvoir's intimate circle, including her relationship with American writer Nelson Algren, to whom the book is dedicated.

Algren was outraged by the frank way Beauvoir described their sexual experiences in both The Mandarins and her autobiographies. Algren vented his outrage when reviewing American translations of Beauvoir's work. Much material bearing on this episode in Beauvoir's life, including her love letters to Algren, entered the public domain only after her death.

Les Inséparables
Beauvoir's early novel Les Inséparables, long suppressed, was published in French in 2020 and two different English translations in 2021. Written in 1954, the book describes her first love, a classmate named Elisabeth Lacoin ("Zaza") who died before age 22, and had as a teenager a "passionate and tragic" relationship with Beauvoir and Merleau-Ponty, then teaching at the same school. Disapproved by Sartre, the novel was deemed "too intimate" to be published during Beauvoir's lifetime.

Later years

Beauvoir wrote popular travel diaries about time spent in the United States and China and published essays and fiction rigorously, especially throughout the 1950s and 1960s. She published several volumes of short stories, including The Woman Destroyed, which, like some of her other later work, deals with aging.

1980 saw the publication of When Things of the Spirit Come First, a set of short stories centered on and based upon women important to her earlier years. Though written long before the novel She Came to Stay, Beauvoir did not at the time consider the stories worth publishing, allowing some forty years to pass before doing so.

Sartre and Merleau-Ponty had a longstanding feud, which led Merleau-Ponty to leave Les Temps modernes. Beauvoir sided with Sartre and ceased to associate with Merleau-Ponty. In Beauvoir's later years, she hosted the journal's editorial meetings in her flat and contributed more than Sartre, whom she often had to force to offer his opinions.

Beauvoir also wrote a four-volume autobiography, consisting of Memoirs of a Dutiful Daughter, The Prime of Life, Force of Circumstance (sometimes published in two volumes in English translation: After the War and Hard Times), and All Said and Done. In 1964 Beauvoir published a novella-length autobiography, A Very Easy Death, covering the time she spent visiting her aging mother, who was dying of cancer. The novella brings up questions of ethical concerns with truth-telling in doctor-patient relationships.

Her 1970 long essay La Vieillesse (The Coming of Age) is a rare instance of an intellectual meditation on the decline and solitude all humans experience if they do not die before about the age of 60.

In the 1970s Beauvoir became active in France's women's liberation movement. She wrote and signed the Manifesto of the 343 in 1971, a manifesto that included a list of famous women who claimed to have had an abortion, then illegal in France. Some argue most of the women had not had abortions, including Beauvoir. Signatories were diverse as Catherine Deneuve, Delphine Seyrig, and Beauvoir's sister Poupette. In 1974, abortion was legalized in France.

In a 1975 interview with Betty Friedan Beauvoir said "No woman should be authorized to stay at home and raise her children. Society should be different. Women should not have that choice, precisely because if there is such a choice, too many women will make that one."

In about 1976 Beauvoir and Sylvie Le Bon made a trip to New York City in the United States to visit Kate Millett on her farm.

In 1981 she wrote La Cérémonie des adieux (A Farewell to Sartre), a painful account of Sartre's last years. In the opening of Adieux, Beauvoir notes that it is the only major published work of hers which Sartre did not read before its publication.

She contributed the piece "Feminism - Alive, Well, and in Constant Danger" to the 1984 anthology Sisterhood Is Global: The International Women's Movement Anthology, edited by Robin Morgan.

After Sartre died in 1980, Beauvoir published his letters to her with edits to spare the feelings of people in their circle who were still living. After Beauvoir's death, Sartre's adopted daughter and literary heir Arlette Elkaïm would not let many of Sartre's letters be published in unedited form. Most of Sartre's letters available today have Beauvoir's edits, which include a few omissions but mostly the use of pseudonyms. Beauvoir's adopted daughter and literary heir Sylvie Le Bon, unlike Elkaïm, published Beauvoir's unedited letters to both Sartre and Algren.

Beauvoir died of pneumonia on 14 April 1986 in Paris, aged 78. She is buried next to Sartre at the Montparnasse Cemetery in Paris. She was honored as a figure at the forefront of the struggle for women's rights around the time of her passing.

Legacy
Simone de Beauvoir's The Second Sex is considered a foundational work in the history of feminism. Beauvoir had denied being feminist multiple times but ultimately admitted that she was one after The Second Sex became crucial in the world of feminism. The work has had a profound influence, opening the way for second-wave feminism in the United States, Canada, Australia, and around the world. Although Beauvoir has been quoted as saying "There is a certain unreasonable demand that I find a little stupid because it would enclose me, immobilize me completely in a sort of feminist concrete block." Her works on feminism have paved the way for all future feminists. The founders of the second-wave read The Second Sex in translation, including Kate Millett, Shulamith Firestone, Juliet Mitchell, Ann Oakley and Germaine Greer.  All acknowledged their profound debt to Beauvoir, including visiting her in France, consulting with her at crucial moments, and dedicating works to her.  Betty Friedan, whose 1963 book The Feminine Mystique is often regarded as the opening salvo of second-wave feminism in the United States, later said that reading The Second Sex in the early 1950s "led me to whatever original analysis of women's existence I have been able to contribute to the Women's movement and its unique politics. I looked to Simone de Beauvoir for a philosophical and intellectual authority."

At one point in the early seventies, Beauvoir also aligned herself with the French League for Women's Rights as a means to campaign and fight against sexism in French society. Beauvoir's influence goes beyond just her impact on second-wave founders, and extends to numerous aspects of feminism, including literary criticism, history, philosophy, theology, criticism of scientific discourse, and psychotherapy. When Beauvoir first became involved with the feminism movement, one of her objectives was legalizing abortion. Donna Haraway wrote that, "despite important differences, all the modern feminist meanings of gender have roots in Simone de Beauvoir's claim that 'one is not born a woman [one becomes one].'" This "most famous feminist sentence ever written" is echoed in the title of Monique Wittig's 1981 essay One Is Not Born a Woman. Judith Butler took the concept a step further, arguing that Beauvoir's choice of the verb to become suggests that gender is a process, constantly being renewed in an ongoing interaction between the surrounding culture and individual choice.

In Paris, Place Jean-Paul-Sartre-et-Simone-de-Beauvoir is a square where Beauvoir's legacy lives on. It is one of the few squares in Paris to be officially named after a couple. The pair lived close to the square at 42 rue Bonaparte.

Prizes
 Prix Goncourt, 1954
 Jerusalem Prize, 1975
 Austrian State Prize for European Literature, 1978

Works

List of publications (non-exhaustive)
 L'Invitée (1943) (English – She Came to Stay) [novel]
 Pyrrhus et Cinéas (1944) [nonfiction]
 Le Sang des autres (1945) (English – The Blood of Others) [novel]
 Les Bouches inutiles (1945) (English - Who Shall Die?) [drama]
 Tous les hommes sont mortels (1946) (English – All Men Are Mortal) [novel]
 Pour une morale de l'ambiguïté (1947) (English – The Ethics of Ambiguity) [nonfiction]
 "America Day by Day" (1948) (English – 1999 – Carol Cosman (Translator and Douglas Brinkley (Foreword) [nonfiction]
 Le Deuxième Sexe (1949) (English – The Second Sex) [nonfiction]
 L'Amérique au jour le jour (1954) (English – America Day by Day)
 Les Mandarins  (1954) (English – The Mandarins) [novel]
 Must We Burn Sade? (1955)
 The Long March (1957) [nonfiction]
 Memoirs of a Dutiful Daughter (1958)
 The Prime of Life (1960)
 Force of Circumstance (1963)
 A Very Easy Death (1964)
 Les Belles Images (1966) [novel]
 The Woman Destroyed (1967) [short stories]
 The Coming of Age (1970) [nonfiction]
 All Said and Done (1972) 
 Old Age (1972) [nonfiction]
 When Things of the Spirit Come First (1979) [novel]
 Adieux: A Farewell to Sartre (1981)
 Letters to Sartre (1990)
 Journal de guerre, Sept 1939 – Jan 1941 (1990); English – Wartime Diary (2009)
 A Transatlantic Love Affair: Letters to Nelson Algren (1998)
 Diary of a Philosophy Student, 1926–27 (2006)
 Cahiers de jeunesse, 1926–1930 (2008)

Selected translations
 Patrick O'Brian was Beauvoir's principal English translator, until he attained commercial success as a novelist.
 
 Philosophical Writings (Urbana : University of Illinois Press, 2004, edited by Margaret A. Simons et al.) contains a selection of essays by Beauvoir translated for the first time into English. Among those are: Pyrrhus and Cineas, discussing the futility or utility of action, two previously unpublished chapters from her novel She Came to Stay and an introduction to The Ethics of Ambiguity.

See also
 List of women's rights activists
 French feminism

References

Sources
 Appignanesi, Lisa, 2005, Simone de Beauvoir, London: Haus, 
 
 Bair, Deirdre, 1990. Simone de Beauvoir: A Biography. New York: Summit Books, 
 Rowley, Hazel, 2005. Tête-a-Tête: Simone de Beauvoir and Jean-Paul Sartre. New York: HarperCollins.
 Suzanne Lilar, 1969. Le Malentendu du Deuxième Sexe (with collaboration of Prof. Dreyfus). Paris, University Presses of France (Presses Universitaires de France).
 Fraser, M., 1999.  Identity Without Selfhood: Simone de Beauvoir and Bisexuality, Cambridge and New York: Cambridge University Press.
 Axel Madsen, Hearts and Minds: The Common Journey of Simone de Beauvoir and Jean-Paul Sartre, William Morrow & Co, 1977.
 Hélène Rouch, 2001–2002, Trois conceptions du sexe: Simone de Beauvoir entre Adrienne Sahuqué et Suzanne Lilar, Simone de Beauvoir Studies, n° 18, pp. 49–60.
 
 Simone de Beauvoir, Marguerite Yourcenar, Nathalie Sarraute, 2002. Conférence Élisabeth Badinter, Jacques Lassalle & Lucette Finas, .

Further reading
 Le Malentendu du Deuxième Sexe by Suzanne Lilar, 1969.
 Feminist Theory and Simone de Beauvoir by Toril Moi, 1990.
 
 Appignanesi, Lisa. Simone de Beauvoir. London: Penguin. 1988. .
 Bair, Deirdre. Simone de Beauvoir: A Biography. New York: Summit Books. 1990. .
 Coffin, Judith G. Love, and Letters: Writing Simone de Beauvoir. Ithaca and London: Cornell University Press. 2020. .
 Francis, Claude. Simone de Beauvoir: A Life, A Love Story. Lisa Nesselson (Translator). New York: St. Martin's, 1987. .
 Green, Karen (2022). Simone de Beauvoir. Cambridge University Press.
 Okely, Judith. Simone de Beauvoir. New York: Pantheon. 1986. .

External links

 
 
 
 
 Guardian Books "Author Page", with profile and links to further articles.
 
 Victoria Brittain et al discuss Simone de Beauvoir's lasting influence, ICA 1989
 
 
 
 "Simone de Beauvoir", Great Lives, BBC Radio 4, 22 April 2011
Kate Kirkpatrick. (6 November 2017) "What is authentic love? A View from Simone de Beauvoir" . IAI News.

 
1908 births
1986 deaths
20th-century French non-fiction writers
20th-century French novelists
20th-century French philosophers
20th-century French memoirists
20th-century French women writers
20th-century French LGBT people
Atheist feminists
Atheist philosophers
Bisexual feminists
Bisexual women
French bisexual writers
Burials at Montparnasse Cemetery
Communist women writers
Continental philosophers
Critical theorists
Deaths from pneumonia in France
Epistemologists
Existentialists
Feminist philosophers
Feminist studies scholars
Feminist theorists
Former Roman Catholics
French abortion-rights activists
French anti-war activists
French atheists
French communists
French socialists
French ethicists
French feminist writers
French literary critics
Women literary critics
French Marxists
French political philosophers
French women non-fiction writers
French women novelists
French women philosophers
Jerusalem Prize recipients
Légion d'honneur refusals
Bisexual memoirists
French LGBT novelists
Marxist feminists
French Marxist writers
Materialist feminists
Metaphysicians
Ontologists
Phenomenologists
Philosophers of art
Philosophers of culture
Philosophers of education
Philosophers of literature
Philosophers of nihilism
Philosophers of sexuality
Political philosophers
Prix Goncourt winners
French social commentators
French women critics
Social philosophers
French socialist feminists
University of Paris alumni
French women memoirists
Writers from Paris
French magazine founders
LGBT philosophers
Signatories of the 1971 Manifesto of the 343